Sukhpal Singh Bhullar (24 June 1978) is an Indian politician and a member of Indian National Congress. In 2017, he was elected as the member of the Punjab Legislative Assembly from Khemkaran South Assembly constituency.

Constituency
Singh Bhullar represents the Khemkaran South Assembly constituency. Singh Bhullar won the Khemkaran South Assembly constituency on an Indian National Congress ticket, he beat the member of the Punjab Legislative Assembly Virsa Singh of the Shiromani Akali Dal by over 19602 votes.

Political party
Singh Bhullar is from the Indian National Congress and he is also the MLA of Khemkaran South Assembly constituency.

References

Living people
People from Amritsar district
Punjab, India MLAs 2017–2022
1978 births